The Untamed is a 2019 Chinese web series loosely based on the BL xianxia novel Mo Dao Zu Shi by Mo Xiang Tong Xiu, starring Xiao Zhan and Wang Yibo. It begun airing in China on Tencent Video from June 27, 2019. The series follows the adventures of two cultivators who travel to solve a series of murder mysteries, eventually finding and defeating the true culprit. The series is produced by Tencent Penguin Pictures, and filmed from April 2018 to August 2018 at Hengdian World Studios.  Cheng Wai Man and Chen Jia Lin are credited as the show's directors, and the producers are credited to be Fang Feng, Yang Xia, Wang Chu and Liu Ming Yi.

The series aired every Thursday and Friday (GMT +08:00) with two episodes each, with Tencent VIP members able to access two more episodes ahead of time. On the first day of its release, a total of six episodes were available to VIP members. On June 30, 2019, their official Weibo released an official trailer and a new schedule, shifting the release to Monday till Wednesday. This series completed broadcast August 20, 2019 with the 50th episode. On July 29, 2019, during an official fanmeeting event, Tencent announced that VIP members would be able to watch all the episodes on August 7 instead.

Episodes

See also 
 Mo Dao Zu Shi

References 

Lists of web series episodes